The USBWA Most Courageous Awards are two annual basketball awards given by the United States Basketball Writers Association (USBWA) to figures associated with college basketball who, according to the organization, have "demonstrated extraordinary courage reflecting honor on the sport of amateur basketball." Since 2012, the women's version of the award has been named the Pat Summitt Most Courageous Award in honor of the legendary Tennessee women's coach who received the award that year. Effective with the 2021 awards, the men's version is known as the Perry Wallace Most Courageous Award in honor of the Vanderbilt player who was the first African-American basketball player in the Southeastern Conference.

History and selection
The award was first presented in 1978, and was not initially restricted exclusively to college basketball, although every winner since 1980 has been associated with the college game in some manner. Through 2009, a single award was presented; starting in 2010, separate awards have been given for men's and women's college basketball. More than one individual can receive an award, with the most recent example being in 2023, when the men's award was presented to players Terrence Hargrove of Saint Louis and Connor Odom of Utah State. Traditionally, the winners receive their awards at the men's or women's Final Four (as applicable), although the awards can be presented earlier as circumstances dictate. The most notable exception was when the 2015 Summitt Award was presented to Lauren Hill at halftime of her first college game in November 2014, presumably so she would receive the award while alive (at the time, she was not expected to survive until the 2015 Final Four). Only the men's award was presented in 2021, but both awards were again presented in 2022.

Most honorees have been cited for courage as current or former college players. However, the list of recipients also includes coaches, the wife of a coach, two broadcasters, a referee, an athletic program staffer, the widow of a former player (recognized alongside her late husband), and three college basketball programs.

The award's bifurcation by sex or gender is not based on that of the recipient, but rather on whether the recipient was connected to the men's or women's game. In 2019, a woman received the men's award and a man received the women's award.

Winners
All affiliations listed were current at the time the award was presented. The "Notes" column indicates the situation that led the USBWA to present the award.

Single award (1978–2009)
All winners during this period were associated with men's basketball unless noted otherwise.

Men's award (2010–present)

Women's award (2010–present)

References
General
 Winners through 2011: 

Specific

External links
Official site

Awards established in 1978
College basketball trophies and awards in the United States
1978 establishments in the United States